Richard Beaumont may refer to:

Sir Richard Beaumont, 1st Baronet (1574–1631), English politician and MP
Richard Ashton Beaumont (1912–2009), British diplomat
Richard Beaumont (actor) (born 1961), British actor, in Scrooge and Whoever Slew Auntie Roo?
Richard Beaumont (rugby league) (born 1988), English rugby league player

See also

Beaumont (disambiguation)